Oraško Brdo is a village in the municipality of Bosanski Petrovac, Bosnia and Herzegovina.

Demographics 
According to the 2013 census, its population was 0, down from 65 in 1991.

References

Populated places in Bosanski Petrovac